Gorytvesica paraleipa is a species of moth of the family Tortricidae. It is found in Napo Province, Ecuador.

The wingspan is 21-22.5 mm. The forewings are ferruginous, suffused with brown up to the middle. The hindwings are brownish with rust suffusion apically.

Etymology
The species name refers to the similarity with Gorytvesica cosangana and is derived from Greek
paraleipo (meaning not turning attention).

References

Moths described in 2005
Euliini
Moths of South America
Taxa named by Józef Razowski